Sailesh Dutt (born 1911) was an Indian cricketer. He played seven first-class matches for Bengal between 1938 and 1944.

See also
 List of Bengal cricketers

References

External links
 

1911 births
Year of death missing
Indian cricketers
Bengal cricketers
Place of birth missing